The Jubilee Slow March "25 Years of the RKKA", was a Soviet inspection march composed by Semyon Tchernetsky in 1943. Gramophone record No. 265 from the repository of the  indicates this march was dedicated to the last Generalissimo of the Imperial Russian Army, Alexander Suvorov, under the title of "Slow Suvorov". The march was most notably performed during the Moscow Victory Parade of 1945, when Marshall of the Soviet Union, Georgy Zhukov, rode his stallion through the gate of Spasskaya Tower onto Red Square. The 2020 Moscow Victory Day Parade as well as parades in regional cities, both of which were held on 24 June of that year, honoured the 1945 parade with the bands playing the jubilee march at the outset of the parade inspection.

References

Notes

See also
March of the Defenders of Moscow
March of the Soviet Tankmen
Air March
Workers and Peasants Red Army

Russian military marches
Soviet Army